Hedychium coccineum is a species of flowering plant in the ginger family Zingiberaceae. It is native to southern China (Guangxi, Tibet, Yunnan), the Himalayas, India and Indochina. Common names include orange gingerlily, scarlet gingerlily and orange bottlebrush ginger.

This erect herbaceous perennial grows on the edge of forests and in mountain grasslands. It prefers partial sunshine, but can tolerate full sun. The flowers can range in colour from red to orange to almost yellow.

References

External links
 Hedychium coccineum, red gingerlily, from China

Flora of China
Flora of the Indian subcontinent
Flora of Indo-China
Plants described in 1811
coccineum